Ingli puudutus is an unplugged album by Estonian rock band Terminaator. The CD is coupled by a DVD.

The "Ingli puudutus" acoustic concert tour lasted from 24–26 November 2008. The first two were held in Tallinn at Estonian Puppet Theatre, the last in Tartu at Athena Centre. The concert of 25 November was recorded by ETV for the broadcast of ETV Live and this is also featured on the album.

In March 2009, two members of the band, Elmar Liitmaa and Harmo Kallaste, announced their departure from the band. They were however present on 25 March, when a concert to promote the album will be held at the Puppet Theatre.

Track listing
"Osa minust" (Part of me) (from Head uudised)
"See ei ole saladus" (It's not a secret) (from Head uudised)
"Armudes üksindusse" (Falling in love with loneliness) (from Lõputu päev)
"Romula" (Wrecking yard) (from Kuutõbine)
"Preeriatuul" (Prairie wind) (from Singapur)
"Pankuri tütar ja töölise poeg" (Banker's daughter and laborer's son) (from Nagu esimene kord)
"Šaakali päev" (Day of the jackal) (from Pühertoonia)
"Ainult sina võid mu maailma muuta" (Only you can change my world) (from Lõputu päev)
"Alkeemik" (Alchemist) (from 20)
"Viski" (Whiskey) (from Minu väike paradiis)
"Tahan ärgata üles" ([I] wanna wake up) (from Pühertoonia)
"Lasud" (Shots) (from Nagu esimene kord)
"Nagu esimene kord" (Like on the first time) (from Nagu esimene kord)
"Ingli puudutus" (Touch of an angel) (from Pühertoonia)
"Ütle miks?" (Say why?) (from Minu väike paradiis)
"Pilves selgimistega" (Cloudy with bright spells)

Personnel

The band
 Jaagup Kreem - vocals, guitar
 Henno Kelp - bass guitar
 Ronald Puusepp - drums
 Elmar Liitmaa - electric guitar, backing vocals
 Harmo Kallaste - keyboards

Additional musicians
 Tiit Kikas - string instruments
 Dagmar Oja - backing vocals
 Kaire Vilgats - backing vocals

Terminaator albums
Estonian-language albums
2009 live albums